Chassey-le-Camp is a commune in the Saône-et-Loire department in the region of Bourgogne-Franche-Comté in eastern France.

History 
The commune of Chassey-le-Camp is known for giving its name to the archaeological culture of the late Neolithic (Stone Age) named Chasséen.

Wine 

Vineyards of Chassey-le-Camp form part of the Bouzeron appellation d'origine contrôlée in the Cote Chalonnaise sub-region of Burgundy. Bouzeron is an appellation for white wine made exclusively from the Aligoté grape, created in 1998. Pinot noir and Chardonnay wines are also produced in the commune, but sold under the appellations Bourgogne rouge or blanc or Bourgogne Côte Chalonnaise.

See also
Communes of the Saône-et-Loire department

References

Communes of Saône-et-Loire
Saône-et-Loire communes articles needing translation from French Wikipedia